is the largest island in the Geiyo Islands chain, and the westernmost which accommodates the Nishiseto Expressway between Honshu and Shikoku. It is located in the Seto Inland Sea.

Geography
The island's  reservoir is the primary freshwater source for Ōmishima itself and nearby Hakata.

Climate

History
 1541 - Tsuruhime fights Ōuchi Yoshitaka fleet
 1874 - post office established
 1979 -  connecting to Ehime Prefecture complete
 1991 - Tatara Bridge connecting to Hiroshima Prefecture complete
 16 January 2005 - the towns (including Ōmishima, Ehime) and villages of the island were merged into city of Imabari, Ehime

Transportation
Ōmishima is connected to the mainland of Honshu and Shikoku islands by bridges of Nishiseto Expressway (Shimanami Kaidō). Also, ferry is available to Ōsakikamijima, Okamura Island and Ōkunoshima (Rabbit Island). Ōmishima Island is served by the national Route 317.

Attractions
The salt factory
Historical and marine museum
Ōyamazumi Shrine
Toyo Ito Museum of Architecture, Imabari
The entire Ōmishima Island is designated as a National Place of Scenic Beauty

Notable residents
Shozo Fujita - historian
Tsuruhime - priestess and warlord

External links
Imabari city official site

References
This article incorporates material from Japanese Wikipedia pages 大三島 and 大三島町, accessed 13 September 2017

Islands of Ehime Prefecture
Islands of the Seto Inland Sea
Geiyo Islands
Special Places of Scenic Beauty